Chyp-Notic were a German Eurodance group formed in 1988, who had several hits between 1990 and 1993, including a cover of "Nothing Compares 2 U" and "I Can't Get Enough".

History
Vlad Mint, Jan Erik and Walter Bee founded the band in 1988 under the name Toys. Two years later, the trio renamed to Chyp-Notic, and landed a recording contract with Coconut Records. Mint ended his training as a dental technician, Bee gave up his job as a computer programmer and Erik sold his shares at a nightclub.

They released their first and best-known single "Nothing Compares 2 U" in 1990. This uptempo cover of Sinéad O'Connor's cover of the Prince song reached #16 on the German singles chart. The beat is lifted from the Raze song "Break 4 Love". After two albums and several successes, including a top 20 placing for the third single "I Can't Get Enough" in 1991, the band broke up in 1994.

Discography

Albums
 1990: Nothing Compares
 1992: I Can't Get Enough

Compilations
 2008: Greatest Hits
 2015: 25

Singles

References

External links 
 
 

German Eurodance groups
German pop music groups
German dance music groups
Musical groups established in 1988
Musical groups from Cologne
Bertelsmann Music Group artists